North Blenheim is a hamlet (and census-designated place) in the town of Blenheim, Schoharie County, New York, United States. It had the longest wooden, single-span covered bridge in the United States, the Old Blenheim Bridge. It was built in 1855 and remained intact until 2011, when it was destroyed by flooding caused by Hurricane Irene. The "Blenheim Gilboa Power Project Visitors Center" is also located there. The Blenheim covered bridge has been rebuilt and opened in 2019.

External links
 NYS Power Authority's Blenheim-Gilboa Power Project Visitors Center

References

Hamlets in New York (state)
Hamlets in Schoharie County, New York